Alexander Moyzes (4 September 1906 – 20 November 1984) was a Slovak neoromantic composer.

Biography

Moyzes was born into a musical family in 1906 at  Kláštor pod Znievom, Austro-Hungarian Empire. His father was the composer and educator Mikuláš Moyzes. After earlier technical studies, in 1925 he entered the Prague Conservatory, where he studied organ, conducting and composition. He graduated in 1929 and went on to study in the master class of Vítězslav Novák, from which he graduated in the following year with his Overture for Orchestra, Opus 10. It was Novák who directed his attention to Slovak music, the source of his inspiration.

In 1929, Moyzes was appointed to the teaching staff of the Music and Drama Academy for Slovakia in Bratislava. He became professor of composition at the Bratislava Conservatory in 1941 and spent a number of years as principal music advisor to Radio Bratislava, until compelled to resign in 1948. On its foundation he was appointed professor of composition at the Bratislava Music Academy, where he taught no less than three generations of Slovak composers.  He headed the Academy as Rector from 1965 until 1971, and over the years undertook many important functions in the musical life of his country.  He died in Bratislava.

With Eugen Suchoň and Ján Cikker, Alexander Moyzes is considered one of the three leading composers of his generation in Slovakia. He succeeded in creating a style of composition that was thoroughly Slovak in inspiration, yet nevertheless took account of contemporary trends in European music, a synthesis that he was to consolidate in his later years.

Pieces

Orchestra
Down the River Váh, Op. 26 (1935)
Pohronie Dances, Op. 43 (1950)
Gemer Dances, Op. 51 (1956)
Violin Concerto, Op. 53
Symphony No. 1 in D major, Op. 31 (1929, rev. 1937)
Symphony No. 2 in A minor, Op. 16 (1932)
Symphony No. 3 in B flat major, Op. 18 (1942)
Symphony No. 4 in E flat major, Op. 38 (1947, rev. 1957)
Symphony No. 5 in F major, Op. 39 (1947–48)
Symphony No. 6 in E major, Op. 44 (1951)
Symphony No. 7, Op. 50 (1954–55)
Flute Concerto, Op. 61
Symphony No. 8, Op. 64 (1968–69)
Symphony No. 9, Op. 69 (1971)
Symphony No. 10, Op. 77 (1977–78)
Symphony No. 11, Op. 79
Symphony No. 12, Op. 83

Chamber
Four String Quartets (Op. 8, 66, 83 and without opus number)

Piano
Jazz Sonata for two pianos, op. 14

References

External links
Biography 

1906 births
1984 deaths
20th-century classical composers
20th-century male musicians
Neoromantic composers
Male classical composers
People from Martin District
Pupils of Vítězslav Novák
Prague Conservatory alumni
Slovak composers
Slovak male musicians